Monte Ne was a community in the Ozark mountains of the White River valley east of Rogers, on the edge of Beaver Lake, in the US state of Arkansas. From 1901 until the mid-1930s the area was a health resort and ambitious planned community. It was owned and operated by William Hope Harvey, a financial theorist and one-time U.S. Presidential nominee. Two of its hotels, "Missouri Row" and "Oklahoma Row", were the largest log buildings in the world. Oklahoma Row's "tower section" is one of the earliest examples of a multi-story concrete structure. The tower is the only structure of Monte Ne still standing that can be seen at normal lake levels. Monte Ne introduced the first indoor swimming pool in Arkansas, and was also the site of the only presidential convention ever held in the state.

The Monte Ne resort was not a financial success, due in part to Harvey's failure to adequately manage the resort's funds. All ventures associated with Harvey's original Monte Ne concept either were never completed or experienced bankruptcy, and shortly after his death in 1936, the property was sold off in lots. The remainder of the resort and town was almost completely submerged after Beaver Lake was created in 1964. All that remains today are foundations and one severely vandalized structure. The area on the edge of Beaver Lake that is still referred to as Monte Ne is owned and managed by the United States Army Corps of Engineers and serves mainly as a boat ramp.

Before Harvey 
The area that would become Monte Ne was known to have had two establishments often considered essential to a pioneer settlement, a grist mill and a distillery. It is unknown when the distillery was built. It was owned in the 1830s by Abe McGarrah and his brother-in-law; they also operated a small store. The distillery's output each day was given as 30 gallons by the Federal whiskey gauger who resided in the area. The grist mill was built in 1856, and was owned by J.R. Pettigrew. It would later be owned by James Wyeth and Amelia Crowder Blake, the parents of Betty Blake, who is often referred to as the "Leading Lady" of Rogers, and who married entertainer Will Rogers in 1908. In 1875, the post office in the area changed its name from Mountain Springs to Pettigrew's Mill. The Blakes owned the mill until 1882, when James Blake died. The mill was later operated by David Portnell from 1889 to 1895. He sold his interest in the mill to a retired Congregational minister J.G. Bailey. Bailey later became postmaster. He petitioned the Post Office Department to change the name of the office to Vinola, in honor of a well-known vineyard that belonged to his neighbor Carl A. Starek. The letter was written in longhand, and the o and l were spaced too close together. As a result, the clerk misread the name as "Vinda", which is how it was recorded. The area's name was later changed to Silver Springs. Bailey sold 325 acres of land and a cabin to Harvey.

Coin Harvey 

Monte Ne was entirely conceived and funded by William "Coin" Hope Harvey, a well-known businessman, politician, lecturer and author during the 1890s. Although Harvey was financially successful at silver mining in Colorado, Monte Ne seems to have been funded mostly by the sales of Harvey's writings which dealt with the subject of free silver. His most popular pamphlet, entitled Coin's Financial School, was published in 1893. Sales were buoyed by Harvey's involvement in the 1896 presidential campaign of William Jennings Bryan, and it sold two million copies. Though Bryan lost his bid for president, Harvey had become so important to the campaign that he was made chairman of the Democratic Ways & Means Committee to collect money for the 1900 campaign. However, as a result of an argument before the campaign, he resigned.

After Bryan lost his bid for president, Harvey retreated to the Ozark mountains of Northwest Arkansas. In October 1900 he purchased 320 acres (130 ha) of land in Silver Springs (close to present day Rogers) from Reverend Bailey. From that time on he lived in Arkansas, and claimed that he preferred the state because it had no large cities or extremely wealthy people. Leaving his family behind in Chicago, Harvey moved into Reverend Bailey's run-down log house. Harvey's son Tom joined him shortly thereafter to help prepare the house for the rest of the family. They were joined later by Harvey's wife Anna and their children, Annette and Hal. The house burned down a few months after they took up residence, and all of the family's possessions, including Harvey's large library, were lost. Harvey carried no insurance on the house, and after its destruction Anna went back to Chicago, returning to Arkansas only a few times thereafter for brief visits.

Harvey's land purchase in Silver Springs coincided with a desire by the local postmaster to change the name of the area, because it was often confused with Siloam Springs, Arkansas. Harvey chose the name Monte Ne, which supposedly combined the Spanish and Omaha Indian words for mountain water,  because it "fit the tongue attractively". Harvey was familiar with European health spas, and wanted to turn Monte Ne into a "watering hole" in the Ozarks. He first commissioned the dredging of a canal, and Silver Springs Creek was narrowed between Big Spring and Elixir Spring, which created Big Spring Lake. The Creek was then channeled to form what Harvey referred to as "the lagoon". Limestone retaining walls were built along the banks of the creeks and the lake, and along boardwalks and park areas. Monte Ne quickly became a popular spot for pleasure boating, picnics, and other outdoor activities. Many people noted how clear the water was. The Rogers Democrat said that it looked "like pure alcohol".

Hotel rows 
In December 1900, with US$52,000 of individual investors' money and $48,000 of his own, Harvey formed the Monte Ne Investment Company, which held the deeds to all of the land. The first hotel completed was the Hotel Monte Ne in April 1901, which opened in May. It was three stories high and had two wings 300 feet (91 m) long. Each room had a doorway to the outside, and the hotel was surrounded with wide porches. 

In April 1904, Harvey organized the Monte Ne Club House Hotel and Cottage Company with capital stock of $250,000. A. O. Clarke, from St. Louis, served as architect and superintendent of the company. Harvey proposed to build five large hotels: a three-story main building called the Club House Hotel and four 300 to 450 foot (91 to 137 m) long "cottage rows", each to be named for a state bordering on Arkansas. Stock holders in the company received stock certificates that listed privileges such as transportation on the Monte Ne Railroad with 150 lb (68 kg) of baggage and a 25% discount for the stockholder and his family at the Hotel Monte Ne. Missouri Row, begun in August 1904, was the first hotel constructed. Fourteen thousand cubic feet (396 m³) of concrete were used. The tiles were shipped from Chicago. The center and two ends of the hotel rose to two stories, the remainder being a single story. The hotel had forty 16 feet square (4.9 metres square) rooms, each with a fireplace. Harvey employed area carpenters and stonemasons to build Missouri Row. In April 1905, to save time and money, the work schedule was changed from 9 to 10 hours per day and some wages were cut. Many workers went on strike, and when their demands were not met, they quit. The men formed a union, and although Harvey thought of himself as a friend to the working man, he viewed unions as another kind of monopoly or trust. The strike delayed construction, but by the end of May 1905, a full workforce was in place. In July, carpet, washstands and furniture, including iron-and-brass bedsteads, were installed in the rooms. Cannonballs and shells from the Pea Ridge battlefield were sunk into the concrete porch on either side of the main entrance. The hotel opened in September 1905 with room rates of $1 a day and $6 a week.

In February 1907, with nearly 300 new stockholders, Harvey began construction on his next hotel, Oklahoma Row, also designed by A. O. Clarke. It was built to the west of Missouri Row with a wide lawn. It had a similar log, concrete stone, and tile construction. The dining room was on the north end. Each of the 40 rooms had fireplaces, as did the dining room and center hall. Every room featured electric lights, sewerage, and running spring water. The hotel also boasted a three-story concrete tower, one of the earliest multistory concrete constructions in the country. Oklahoma Row and other construction projects drained Harvey's funds. Harvey managed to raise enough money to finish Oklahoma Row, but due to his lack of funds, when that hotel finally opened there was no gala event, as there had been when Missouri Row was finished.

Theme song 
In 1901, Harvey commissioned a theme song for Monte Ne. "Beautiful Monte Ne" was written by a Rogers local, Edward Wolfe, and copyrighted by Harvey in 1906. 
Beautiful Monte Ne, God's gift to man they say
Health resort of all the world is beautiful Monte Ne
Rosy cheeks and purer blood they gain there day by day
in mountain air water rare at beautiful Monte Ne

Railroad 

Harvey needed a way to get people to Monte Ne. In 1900, there were few adequate roads, and automobiles were not yet practical. The natural solution seemed to be to build a railroad from Lowell, Arkansas to Monte Ne. The Arkansas Railroad Commission granted a charter on April 26, 1902, and the Monte Ne Railway Company was incorporated in May 1902, with a capital stock of $250,000. Besides Harvey, the company included: Carl A. Starck, P. G. Davidson, A. L. Williams, B. R. Davidson, J. H. McIlroy, J. W. Kimmons, F. F. Freeman, J. F. Felker, Robert H. Harven and Thomas W. Harvey (Coin's brother). Another of Harvey's brothers, a banker at Huntington, West Virginia, furnished $25,000. Of the 250 shares in the company, 240 were registered in Harvey's name. The five-mile (8 km) private railroad spur started at the Lowell transfer station. Fourteen thousand oak railway ties were laid running through Cross Hollows, south of Rogers, where two ravines met. It then passed through Limedale, terminating above Big Spring Lake at a log cabin depot with open-air waiting rooms. Harvey leased an engine, a tender, and a passenger coach from the St. Louis and San Francisco Railroad. The railway opened on June 19, 1902. Harvey imported a 50-foot (15 m) gondola from Venice in July 1901 to meet guests arriving by rail and carry them to the resort.

The gondola was a very popular attraction, and Harvey often promoted Monte Ne as: "the only place in America where the gondola meets the train."

The little railroad went broke a few years later. At about this time, the Arkansas, Oklahoma & Western Railroad (AO&W) was forming. The railroad ran from Rogers to Siloam Springs, over a distance of approximately 30 miles (43 km). It was opened for traffic on New Year's Day 1908, connecting with the Frisco at Rogers and the Kansas City, Pittsburgh and Gulf (P&G) at Siloam Springs. The AO&W planned to build eastward to Eureka Springs. On December 1, 1909, the AO&W purchased the Monte Ne railroad. To connect the AO&W and the Monte Ne, a track would have to be laid from Hazelwood, Arkansas on the AO&W to Lowell; the Frisco line was in the way, and they would not allow a connection. The AO&W instead built an expensive underpass of the Frisco. The construction of the underpass enabled the Monte Ne line to turn over much of its outbound freight business to the AO&W rather than competitor Frisco. So the line enjoyed a brief but substantial volume of outgoing freight traffic from the Rogers White Lime Company located at Limedale. The underpass still exists and is still crossed by trains of Frisco Central Division successor Arkansas and Missouri Railroad.

The AO&W went bankrupt a few years later and was bought by another startup railroad, the Kansas City & Memphis Railroad (KC&M) in early 1911. It would build from Cave Springs, a few miles west of Rogers, through Fayetteville and towards Memphis, Tennessee. In 1912 the Ozark Land and Lumber Company began construction of a 5-mile extension east of Monte Ne from the White River to the Piney community and leased the line to the KC&M.  The White River bridge consisted of 780 feet of trestle and 2,152 foot steel spans, making it the longest railroad bridge in Benton County. This extension was used to haul out forestry products. The KC&M entered receivership in 1914, and in September of that year passenger service to Monte Ne ended. When the U.S. entered World War I in 1917, many railroads were seized by the United States government. The KC&M was not seized, and due to unfavorable rulings by the United States Railroad Administration and Arkansas Railroad Commission saw much of its revenue evaporate. In January 1918 Roscoe Hobbs, one of the court-appointed receivers of the KC&M, went to Washington, D.C. to provide testimony to the Senate Committee on Interstate Commerce on the effects of these decisions on small railroads. As part of that testimony Hobbs reported 215 cars from the Rogers White Lime Company and 216 cars of pit props and railroad ties being hauled on the Monte Ne portion of the railway in 1917. Hobbs was unsuccessful in having the decisions reversed, and most portions of the KC&M were abandoned by October 1918. The Monte Ne portion was used until 1919. The White River bridge survived longer and was used for horse and foot traffic before becoming unsafe. The steel spans were scrapped during World War II.

Business 
In August 1901, Harvey's son Hal and brother-in-law Ernest Halliday opened a large bathhouse on Silver Springs Creek, across the lagoon from Hotel Monte Ne. The indoor pool was the first in Arkansas. Water from the spring flowed into the swimming pool, half of which was sectioned off and featured heated water piped in from a wood-fired boiler. The bathhouse also had a two-lane bowling alley. The pool continued to be a popular attraction throughout the life of Monte Ne until the opening of an outdoor pool in Willola in 1923.

In April, Harvey began seeking industries to move to Monte Ne, but few actually did. Monte Ne's small downtown area had at one time a general store, a livery stable, a gristmill, and a post office. The general store also served as a host for school plays and as a Masonic Lodge.

Harvey issued his own money, or scrip, which was accepted and used as cash in and around Monte Ne. Scrip was a way of financing his mercantile without requiring operating capital. Harvey would purchase items with the scrip and promised to redeem it within 30 days. If the item did not sell, the scrip had no value. Also in downtown was the Bank of Monte Ne. It was organized by Harvey in 1905 and the building was designed, like many buildings in Monte Ne, by A. O. Clarke. The two-story, 50 by 70 ft (15 by 21 m) building (usually referred to as the "Bank Block") included the bank and a store room on the main floor, as well as a lodge room and offices on the second floor. The building was across the street from the post office. The Interstate Bankers' Summer Club held their 1906 meeting there and the local Odd Fellows lodge were among the groups who used the upstairs offices. Harvey sold stock in the bank for $15 a share. The bank lasted until 1914. Depositors and lenders were paid off and any other funds were transferred to a bank in Rogers.

To help attract tourists, Harvey often brought in musicians and hosted dances and other events to give Monte Ne a constant festive atmosphere. He used the Monte Ne Herald, run by his son Tom, to promote these events. The newspaper only lasted until 1905, probably due to financial troubles and Harvey's publication of personal attacks. There were sporting events in Monte Ne such as tennis, croquet, and fox hunting. Monte Ne also had the first golf course, which was built sometime before 1909. Harvey's difficult-to-please nature often ended up driving away more people than it attracted. Harvey had a lights-out at 10 p.m. policy, and would cut the main electricity to the town if the policy was disobeyed, prompting disgruntled guests to leave prematurely. He was also criticized for holding events on Sunday and for banning children and people who were ill from the resort.

Roads 
After the Monte Ne Railroad failed, Harvey needed to find other ways for people to get to his resort. He realized the coming importance of the automobile, and in 1911 he campaigned for a project he called "The Great White Way", a turnpike between Monte Ne and Muskogee, Oklahoma. Harvey Requested that a "Good Roads" meeting be held by the Commercial Club of Rogers; however, they did not feel that it was their meeting because, while fairly well attended, hardly any Rogers businessmen were present. Harvey assessed the project would cost Rogers $5,000 without their permission or consent, and this estimate was far less than what engineers advising the Rogers businessmen believed the cost would be. Ultimately the "Great White Way" project failed, and Harvey blamed the community of Rogers for lack of support.

In 1913 he spearhead the founding of The Ozark Trails Association (OTA) to promote the building and education of quality highway design, but not actually building or funding them. At first, he was only interested in bringing people to Monte Ne, he stated: "My Personal interest in the Ozark Trails is that they all lead to Monte Ne" However, he seems to have taken on a more egalitarian opinion of the Ozark Trails as time went on because he later said: "My inclination runs toward doing something of a progressive nature that will promote the collective good, and I have now concentrated all that inclination on carrying out a system of roads known as the Ozark Trails." The Ozark Trails Association became Harvey's most successful endeavor. Interest in the project spread, and membership swelled to 7,000 delegates from states as far away as New Mexico. The group built large obelisks, listing the names of the benefactors, along the routes and trails that it sponsored. He even ran for Congress on a platform of building a national highway system, but lost to John W. Tillman who had strong support in Washington County.

Interest in the group began to waver noticeably when Harvey finally stepped down as president at a 1920 convention in Pittsburg, Kansas that was attended by only 200 delegates. By the mid-1920s, highways and roads had become completely government-funded and there was no longer a need for local sponsorship. The group's system of giving them historic names and those of contributors had also become confusing and inefficient because of the myriad names and disputes over different names for the same stretch of roadway, so the U.S. Bureau of Public Roads (BPR) changed all the roadways' names to uniform numbers, despite fierce protest from the OTA. The group had lost its relevance and disbanded in 1924, but many of the roads they helped develop became part of the historic U.S. Route 66.

Another group, with no affiliation but with the same name, was created in the early 1970s to promote the maintenance of recreational trails in the Ozarks.

The Pyramid 
By 1910, Harvey was facing serious setbacks. Harvey's son Hal had died in 1903 and was interred in a mausoleum in Monte Ne. His other son, Tom, had left in 1908 never to return. The next decade would not bring better news for Harvey either. Harvey and his wife, Anna, were now permanently estranged after 25 years of marriage. Harvey's close friend William Jennings Bryan failed to find a place for him in the new Woodrow Wilson administration. Harvey's 1913 bid for the Third Congressional District of Arkansas also failed. His Monte Ne was also failing. The railway had been sold and would be scrapped after World War I. The Bank of Monte Ne had also gone out of business. Faced with these severe dilemmas, Harvey had begun reasoning that the end of civilization was at hand. In February 1920, he published Common Sense, in which Harvey announced his intention to leave a message for the future in the form of a pyramid.

Harvey did some deep research into the history of the Ozark Mountains. He claimed that they were some of the oldest mountains in the world and definitely the oldest in the United States. They had been untouched by volcanoes and earthquakes. He believed that the mountains around Monte Ne would eventually crumble and fill the valley with silt and sediment. Archaeologists in the distant future would be able to dig down and find the monument. He called the project "The Pyramid", and dedicated the rest of his life to its construction.

It then would reduce to  square and rise . The next segment would be  and would rise  to become  at the top. The total height would be . In the pedestal there would be  of floor space. Harvey's books, explaining 20th-century civilization, as well as a world globe, a bible, encyclopedias, and newspapers, were to be placed inside two vaults and hermetically sealed in glass. Harvey also wanted to place in this large room: "numerous small items now used in domestic and industrial life, from the size of a needle and safety pin up to a Victrola." It was estimated that the construction would use 16,000 bags of cement,  of sand,  of gravel, and tons of corrugated steel reinforcement. The Portland Cement Association donated the service of one of its experts, who pronounced that the Pyramid would not deteriorate or suffer from erosion and would last for over a million years.

He also built a roughly semi-circular, terraced amphitheater at the foundation of the Pyramid which he called the "foyer". He intended to rent this out and use the revenue for the pyramid project. The land for the amphitheater was first dug in late 1923, and construction continued off and on for the next five years whenever financing, building materials, and labor were available. Unlike other Monte Ne building projects designed by architect A. O. Clark, the amphitheater apparently had no architectural input and was not built according to blueprints or a single design. Those who worked with Harvey noted that he seemed to just "work it out in his mind from day to day". The result was a unique structure, irregular in formation, with seating capacity for anywhere from 500 to 1,000. In the middle of the amphitheater was a small island with two concrete chairs and a concrete couch, intended for an orchestra to play or a speaker to make a presentation. Harvey dedicated the amphitheater before 500 people in 1928.

Following the Egyptian mania that gripped the country after the discovery of King Tut's tomb in 1922, Harvey's Pyramid project sparked a lot of interest and was widely reported throughout the U.S. Tens of thousands of people came to Monte Ne during the 1920s to see its progress. Harvey continued to raise funds from events held at the amphitheater, such as conventions.

Harvey moved his office to his cottage next to the amphitheater, as work continued on the Pyramid. In January 1929, Harvey, along with Lowell and H. L. Hardin of Kansas City, incorporated the project creating The Pyramid Association. The association was to fulfill Harvey's Pyramid plans in the event of his death. The estimated cost of the Pyramid itself was $75,000, but Harvey exhausted his funds on construction of the amphitheater. The stock market crash of 1929 ended all construction. In a last-ditch effort to save the project, Harvey sent letters to wealthy men asking for funds to complete the project. In his letters he explained that civilization was dying and that only rich men, like the intended readers, could save it, if they could send money for his pyramid. Despite the fact that Harvey claimed his correspondence was "the most important letter ever written" he received no replies and the pyramid was never built. All that remains of the project is a retaining wall and the amphitheater that are under the waters of Beaver Lake most of the time.

Failure 
As Harvey's interests shifted to the Pyramid, Monte Ne's resort days effectively ended and the number of visitors slowly dwindled. Activities and events at Monte Ne continued, supported by locals who still visited in large numbers. Harvey sold the Hotel Monte Ne. The hotel went through several name changes and owners, becoming the White Hotel circa 1912, the Randola Inn in 1918, the Hotel Frances in 1925, and in 1930 the Sleepy Valley Hotel. Monte Ne's larger hotels continued to be active after they, along with the dance pavilion and Elixir Spring, were foreclosed and sold at public auction. From 1927 to 1932, Missouri Row and Oklahoma Row (often called the Club House Hotels at this point) were home to the Ozark Industrial College and School of Theology, a nonsectarian school run by Dan W. Evans. The hotels housed pupils—Missouri Row for boys, Oklahoma Row for girls—and Oklahoma Row also provided classroom and dining spaces. Evans and his family lived in the tower. The dance pavilion was enclosed and served as the school chapel. In May 1932, following a mortgage foreclosure against the school, school officials were evicted and the property was sold.

After he announced the building of the Pyramid, at age 69, Harvey began suffering a series of serious health problems, but continued to work tirelessly. In 1926, blood poisoning in his foot put him in a coma that lasted several days resulting in surgery, and three months of recuperation. In 1929 he and Anna were finally divorced. Three days later Harvey married his long-time personal secretary May Leake. In 1930, he came down with double pneumonia. He was also going blind and needed younger people to read his letters and the newspaper to him.

Harvey returned to politics after the 1929 stock market crash and the beginning of the Great Depression. He decided to run for the presidency. He formed the Liberty Party and held their national convention at Monte Ne. It was the only presidential convention ever held in Arkansas. Harvey prepared with railroad excursion rates, media facilities, upgraded roads, and food concessions, anticipating 10,000 delegates. He tented the amphitheater, set up seating, and installed an amplifier system to reach the thousands to be seated outside. Delegates were only eligible to attend if they certified they had read and agreed with the principles of Harvey's newest book The Book, which dealt with the harmful effects of usury by the government. In the end only 786 delegates attended, and Harvey was the only candidate the delegates could agree on. They nominated Andrae Nordskog of Los Angeles for vice president. The Liberty Party ended up merging with the Jobless Party, and Harvey ran for president as an independent; however, he is usually incorrectly credited as being their candidate in that election. Regardless, Franklin Delano Roosevelt won the 1932 presidential election, and Harvey only drew 800 votes.

Harvey continued to publish his newsletter, The Liberty Bell, and sold his books as his health and eyesight continued to fail. On February 11, 1936, he died at Monte Ne due to peritonitis after an attack of intestinal influenza. The tomb made to house his son in 1903 was blasted open, and Harvey's simple cheap pine casket and that of his son were placed in a glass casket filled with copies of Harvey's books and some of his other papers. The tomb was then resealed. A small funeral was held on February 14, and a small plaque bearing the names and dates of the two Harveys was posted.

He died with a balance of $138, debt of $3,000 and no will. The courts decided that the property that was still deeded to the Pyramid foundation belonged to his widow, May, who sold it before moving to Springfield, Missouri, never to return. She died in 1948.

After Harvey 
The bank building was bought in 1944 by D. L. King of Rogers, who remodeled it and made it home to his Atlas Manufacturing Company which produced poultry equipment. However, King moved the business back to Rogers the next year. The building then stood idle, becoming victim to vandalism. All of its windows were smashed and it became covered in graffiti. Eventually, it was nothing more than an empty, roofless, concrete shell.

In 1944, both Missouri and Oklahoma Row were sold to Springdale businessmen Roy Joyce and Jim Barrack. Missouri Row was torn down and sold in small lots. The roof tiles were bought by a Little Rock law firm. By 1956, the building had collapsed, leaving only a small section standing.

Oklahoma Row continued to provide lodging, although it was run and managed by several different people. In June 1946, Company G of the Arkansas State Guard held camp at Monte Ne for field training, using the hotel facilities. Access to Monte Ne improved a bit in August 1947 when the state highway department blacktopped 1.4 miles (2.25 km) of the Monte Ne road. In January, six Monte Ne men were arrested for grand larceny, charged with stealing doors from Oklahoma Row and 500 feet (152 m) of pipe from the swimming pool. A resident of the area, Iris Armstrong opened up a girls' camp just east of the amphitheater in 1922. She named it Camp Joyzelle, after the Maurice Maeterlinck play of the same name. The camp made use of the amphitheater for plays and its cabins, named after Greek goddesses, dotted the hillside. Oklahoma Row was used in 1945 for lodging people who had come to visit the campers. It was used for this purpose up until 1962 as well as for social events and activities such as plays and campfire ceremonies. The camp also used the ticketing section of the old railroad depot for its main lodge and crafts building. In 1955 Dallas Barrack, a Springdale antique dealer, bought Oklahoma Row, and renovated it into an antique store called the Palace Art Galleries. He was to have carried "some of the finest antiques in the area" and believed that "the splendor of the old hotel only adds to their value".

A Baptist church was organized at Monte Ne under the sponsorship of the Benton County Baptist Association as a result of a series of revival meetings conducted there. The Monte Ne Baptist Church is still active. For a time in the summer of 1946, the Rogers Intermediate Girl Scouts held a camp at the Hotel Frances (old Hotel Monte Ne). Although it was not as active as it once was, the old filling station and store in downtown Monte Ne continued to serve the local population.

The Monte Ne Inn, two to three miles (3 to 5 km) away from where the resort was on Highway 94, opened in 1972 and is still in business.

In 1948, W.T. McWhorter purchased Harvey's former log home and office and the amphitheater nearby, and turned it into a restaurant serving chicken, steak, and fish. There was also a concession stand at the amphitheater that operated until 1957, selling drinks, candy, souvenirs, and pamphlets about Harvey.

In January 1957, the Tulsa Daily World reported that 30,000 tourists visited Monte Ne annually to see Harvey's now deteriorating dream. The Arkansas State Historical Society held its 1960 annual meeting at Monte Ne and gathered at the amphitheater to hear Clara Kennan, a Rogers native and school teacher who had been fascinated by Monte Ne her whole life, give a talk on Harvey and his Pyramid project. Her oral history and interviews provide some of the best information on Harvey and Monte Ne.

Beaver Lake 
Discussion of damming the White River for flood control began in the 1930s, and the U.S. Army Corps of Engineers (CoE) held hearings on building a dam in January 1946. The new dam would create a lake 50 miles (80 km) long, and one arm would extend to Monte Ne. Work on Beaver Dam began in 1960 as the CoE impounded and bought land around the White River. In July 1962, Mary Powell sold Camp Joyzelle to the CoE, and W. T. McWhorten sold his land as well.

The Federal Government required that all cemeteries and burial grounds be moved. This included the Harvey tomb, and it was no easy task. In 1962 contractor Harald Mathis of Springdale took nine days to raise the 40-ton tomb and one to move it. The first attempt broke a flatbed truck. Another contractor from Huntsville with a stronger truck then had to be called in. A new road was laid to the new site of Harvey's tomb. The tomb was placed on the crest of a hill donated by Harvey's longtime friends and neighbors Mr. and Mrs. Kenneth Doescher. Today, the tomb sits on private property visible from the Monte Ne boat launch on Beaver Lake. Relocation of the aging tomb put pressure on it, causing it to crack.

The CoE mistakenly believed that the waters of Beaver Lake would cover the area of the large hotels, so those parcels were added to the land they purchased for the project. Dallas Barrack, who owned Oklahoma Row, felt that he had been treated poorly and had received much less than his property was worth. The CoE held a sealed-bid auction and J. G. Gladdens purchased what was left of Missouri and Oklahoma Rows. He planned to move the remnants of Oklahoma Row out of the path of the rising lake waters. In order to do this, it was first necessary to remove the log portion or shell of the hotel. The original windows and doors were dismantled for the move and later reinstalled. The fireplaces, as well as all of the major stonework were later torn down. Also sold at auction were two massive concrete chairs that had been at the base of the amphitheater. They were bought by Mr. and Mrs. Ulis Rose of Rogers and were used to decorate the lawns of their Town and Country restaurant and motel. The chairs are still located in Rogers; however, they now sit unceremoniously in Frisco Park without any plaque or marker indicating their significance. The concrete couch was left in place at the base of the amphitheater, because no one wanted to try to move it.

For years, stories circulated of a treasure being buried within the amphitheater. W. T. McWhorter was determined to find out if it was true, so he planned to dynamite the amphitheater on the day he was to transfer the deed to the CoE. Spectators attended the planned explosion, but it was stopped just in time by CoE attorney David Waid.

The dam was completed, and Beaver Lake was at full height by June 1966. For all intents and purposes, Harvey's Monte Ne was gone. However, in times of drought, some of the structures become visible again. The lake dropped to its lowest level on January 22, 1977, more than 27 feet (8 m) below its average depth, and the amphitheater and bridges were visible for the first time in more than 10 years. Before the water flooded downtown Monte Ne again, the rest of the buildings were either bulldozed or moved to avoid problems for swimmers, boaters, and fishermen. The few bridges that spanned the lagoon and the amphitheater were not demolished.

In 2006, the waters of Beaver Lake once again receded to their lowest level since 1984, just above 1,100 feet (335 m). This generated a new brief interest in Monte Ne and people were once again attracted to the edge of the lake to explore the remains. The upper part of the amphitheater and the retaining wall built for the never constructed pyramid were exposed for a time before being once again swallowed by the lake.

The flooded Monte Ne has become a site of interest for scuba divers who dive by the amphitheater to get a look at the submerged structure. The water is moderately clear and temperatures comfortable.

Remains 

Monte Ne was added to the National Register of Historic Places in 1978 because of the historic significance of being so closely associated with Harvey and its unique architecture and engineering. The log portion of the original Oklahoma Row was moved north and now sits on the east side of Highway 94 in Monte Ne. 

The three-story concrete-and-stone tower was left standing but became a target for vandalism, requiring the addition of fencing to protect it. In 2023 the Corps of Engineers demolished the tower.

All that is left of Missouri Row is a four-sided concrete fireplace surrounded by pieces of foundation, a few sets of stairs, metal plumbing, and a retaining wall. East of that, surrounding what is now the Monte Ne boat launch, are remnants of limestone structures. Some of these are foundations from the broad wooden staircase built in front of Hotel Monte Ne; some are structural components for the twin stone bridges that crossed the lagoon and some are simply low retaining walls. The amphitheater and the retaining wall built for the Pyramid are underwater. Occasionally, when water levels drop in summer, they can be seen.

A few of the roads surrounding the area that was Monte Ne on the edge of Beaver Lake have names reflecting what once was there. Highway 94, which once led to Monte Ne, is also called Monte Ne Road. Country Road 1195, which runs along the lake, is also called Pyramid Street and is a few hundred feet from where the Pyramid would have stood. Similarly Canal Street is nearby, named for the waterways that Harvey's gondolas once traveled. Other roads close by include Oklahoma Drive, Vinda Drive, and Monte Ne Estates Drive.

Notes

References 
 Lord, Allyn. Historic Monte Ne (Images of America). Charleston: Arcadia Publishing, October 9, 2006. .

  "Delightful Monte Ne". (December 1902). Frisco System. Retrieved August 1, 2007.
 "Monte Ne". (February 2006). Washington County Arkansas Genealogical Society. Retrieved August 1, 2007.
 Black, J Dickson. Coin Harvey and His Monte Ne. Bentonville, Arkansas: 1988. ASIN: B00071JU80
 Besom, Evelyn Dodds. (Spring 1990). "Vacationing in the Land Of A Million Smiles". Ozarkswatch. (Winter 1992). Vol. V, No. 3. Retrieved August 1, 2007.
 "American Characters – William Hope Harvey". Richard F Snow. (December 1981). American Heritage Magazine. Volume 33, Issue 1. Retrieved August 1, 2007.
 Monte Ne Inn Chicken. Retrieved August 1, 2007.
 Hales, James F. The Lost Town of Monte Ne. St. Joseph's Ozark Press, LLC, 2009. 
 Winn, Robert G. Railroads of Northwest Arkansas. Washington County Historical Society, 1993. ASIN B0040G4SLW
 Hull, Clifton E. (1988) Shortline Railroads of Arkansas, University of Central Arkansas Press, Conway, Arkansas.

External links 

 Ozarks Underground Photo Album
 Flooded Resort at Monte Ne, Arkansas
 Rogers Historical Museum Article
 Short film Monte Ne: Arkansas' Atlantis
 The Mystery of Monte Ne KNWA Report

Planned communities in the United States
Buildings and structures on the National Register of Historic Places in Arkansas
National Register of Historic Places in Benton County, Arkansas
Populated places on the National Register of Historic Places in Arkansas
Ghost towns in Arkansas
Populated places established in the 1900s
Towers in Arkansas
History of Arkansas
Geography of Benton County, Arkansas
1901 establishments in Arkansas